The Imam Khomeini Stadium (Vârzeshgah-e Emam-e Xemini) is a multi-use stadium in Arak, Markazi, Iran, with a 15,000 seating capacity. The stadium was opened in 2007 and is owned by the Iran Physical Education Organization. It is the home stadium of Aluminium Arak and Shahrdari Arak.

References

External links
 Stadium information 

Football venues in Iran
Buildings and structures in Markazi Province